Moonlighting is an American television series that aired on ABC  from March 3, 1985, to May 14, 1989. The network aired a total of 66 episodes (67 in syndication as the pilot is split into two episodes).  Starring Bruce Willis and Cybill Shepherd as private detectives, the show was a mixture of drama, comedy, and romance, and was considered to be one of the first successful and influential examples of comedy-drama, or "dramedy", emerging as a distinct television genre.

Awards and nominations

Notes

References

Moonlighting